Seyyed Jamal ol Din Asadabadi (also Romanized as Seyyed Jamāl ol Dīn Āsadābādī; also known as Seyyed Jamāl) is a village in Ben Moala Rural District, in the Central District of Shush County, Khuzestan Province, Iran. At the 2006 census, its population was 112, in 19 families.

References 

Populated places in Shush County